Richard C. "Itch" Jones (born 1938) is a retired college baseball coach.

Jones broke his leg while in third grade, and the cast he had to wear caused severe itching. To get a measure of relief, he stuck a flyswatter handle between the cast and his leg. His cousin, Albert, nicknamed him "Itchy."  The nickname stuck, though in later years it was shortened to "Itch."

A 1960 graduate of Southern Illinois University-Carbondale, Jones played second base under Abe Martin. He then played one year in the Baltimore Orioles minor-league system.  In 1961 Jones accepted a position at Jacksonville High School coaching freshman football and junior varsity basketball.  In 1964 Jones was promoted to head varsity basketball coach.  In 1964 Jones led his JHS team to the Sweet Sixteen in the Illinois High School basketball tournament. 

Jones became head baseball coach at MacMurray College in 1966. He then returned to his alma mater as an assistant under Joe Lutz in 1968, becoming head coach in 1970. In 21 years, he led the Salukis to 10 NCAA Tournaments and three College World Series. His best team was the 1971 unit, which came within one game of winning the national title. His record of 738-345-5 is still the best in school history.

In 1991, Jones moved to Illinois as head coach. In 15 years, he compiled a record of 474-373-1, including two Big Ten regular-season titles, a Big Ten Tournament title in 2000, and two NCAA tournament appearances. He retired after the 2005 season. At the time of his retirement, he was the 15th winningest coach in collegiate baseball history.

Twenty of Jones' players went on to play in the major leagues, including Dave Stieb, Steve Finley and Scott Spezio.  He was named national coach of the year twice, in 1971 and 1977.

Head coaching record

See also
List of college baseball coaches with 1,100 wins

References

External links

Minor league stats
SIU Alumni page

1939 births
Living people
Baseball players from Illinois
Illinois Fighting Illini baseball coaches
MacMurray Highlanders baseball coaches
People from Herrin, Illinois
Southern Illinois Salukis baseball coaches
Southern Illinois Salukis baseball players
Stockton Ports players
Bluefield Orioles players